The Lismore House Hotel is a hotel building located in Lismore, County Waterford in Ireland. Formerly known as the Devonshire Arms Hotel, and historically associated with the Duke of Devonshire, it was built in the late 18th century and featured in travel guides since at least the 19th century. It is included on the Record of Protected Structures maintained by Waterford City and County Council. Closed in 2016, as of early 2023, the hotel remained closed.

History

While several sources date the hotel to 1797, and assert that it is reputed to be Ireland's "first purpose-built hotel", other sources (including the National Inventory of Architectural Heritage) suggest that the hotel was developed in the 1840s on the site ("and possibly incorporating fabric") of a 1770s house.

The hotel has been featured in travel guides since at least the 19th century, and a guide from 1871 advises tourists to dine or lunch at the hotel when travelling on the road from Youghal, allowing three shillings for the purpose. The British writer, William Makepeace Thackeray, stayed at the hotel in the mid-19th century.

The hotel was updated and rebranded in 2006, before becoming the subject of litigation between the then owners and bank lenders. This litigation was resolved in 2016, and the hotel was sold in 2018. 

The hotel, which has been closed since 2016, was proposed to be used as temporary emergency accommodation for asylum seekers in early 2023. This proposal was met with some local opposition due to perceived "lack of consultation between the government and the community".

References

Hotels in County Waterford
Hotels established in 1797
Hotel buildings completed in 1797